Lenin-Bulyak (Lenin-Büläk) is a rural locality (a village) in Kashkalevsky Selsoviet, Burayevsky District, Bashkortostan, Russia. The population was 4 as of 2010. There is 1 street.

Geography 
Lenin-Bulyak is located 39 km southeast of Burayevo (the district's administrative centre) by road. Kyzyl-Yul is the nearest rural locality.

References 

Rural localities in Burayevsky District